Sattenapalle railway station (station code:SAP) is an Indian Railway station in Sattenapalle of Guntur district in Andhra Pradesh. It is a D–category station, situated on Nallapadu-Pagidipalli section of Guntur railway division in South Coast Railway zone. It is recognized as one of the Adarsh stations in the division. It forms a new railway line being proposed for the state capital, Amaravati.

See also 
 List of railway stations in India

References 

Railway stations in Guntur district
Railway stations in Guntur railway division